The Jane K. Sather Professorship of Classical Literature is an endowed chair for the study of classics at the University of California, Berkeley. Established in 1914 after a donation by Jane K. Sather, widow of the Norwegian-American banker Peder Sather, the professorship requires its holder to spend one term at the university. Sather Professors would teach a full programme of classes. Since 1919, the post entails a set of lectures on a unified topic which is later published as a book by the University of California Press. According to classicist Oliver Taplin, the chair is "the most prestigious [professorship] in the subject in the world".

Foundation
In 1886, the Norwegian-American banker Peder Sather died, leaving a substantial fortune to his second wife Jane K. Sather. In 1900, after managing the bequest herself for some time, she decided to make an initial donation of $75,000 and other assets to the University of California at Berkeley. At this time, Sather stipulated that her donation be used to establish a professorship of the Classics and a fund for the study of law. Shortly before her death in 1911, she arranged for the funds to be consolidated; they were now to pay for what would become the Sather Tower and the establishment of two professorships: one in Classics and one in historiography. The Regents of the University of California complied with Sather's wishes and divided her donation accordingly. $100,000 were allocated for each of the professorships. Although her husband had accumulated the initial donation, both the tower and the professorships were named after her. In 1914, Benjamin Ide Wheeler, the university's president, appointed the British archaeologist John Myres to be the first holder of the chair.

Professorship

Initially, holder of the professorship would spend one term at Berkeley, teaching a full programme of classes. In 1919, classicists Ivan Mortimer Linforth and George Calhoun modified the nature of the appointment: henceforth, holders would give a specified number of lectures (initially eight, later six) on a unified topic. The lectures should then be published as a book by the University of California Press. Until 1952, Sather Professors were given access to an office in the university's Wheeler Hall which included its own lavatory. The office has since been replaced by rooms in Dwinelle Hall furnished with a dedicated library and portraits of past holders of the chair.

The Sather Professorship has been held by numerous distinguished scholars including Cyril Bailey, E. R. Dodds, Denys Page, Geoffrey Kirk, Ronald Syme, Edward Rand, and Bernard Knox. Appointments in the 21st century have included Latinists Philip Hardie, Alessandro Barchiesi, and Denis Feeney, Hellenists Helene P. Foley, and Gregory Nagy, and historians Mary Beard and Nicholas Purcell. According to classicist Oliver Taplin, the chair is "the most prestigious [professorship] in the subject in the world".

Impact
Writing for The Times Literary Supplement, poet and author Robert Bringhurst states that the Sather Lectures and its associated publications "include many major works of classical scholarship". The 1969 Lectures, given by Hellenist Hugh Lloyd-Jones, offered "an important re-examination of the religious beliefs of the Greeks in the pre-classical and classical periods". They resulted in 1971 in the publication of Lloyd-Jones' first influential publication, The Justice of Zeus. In 1970, historian F. W. Walbank delivered the Sather Lectures on the Greek writer Polybius. His resulting book (Polybius (1972)) was still considered the standard work on this topic in the early 21st century. In 2007, Helene P. Foley gave the first Sather Lecture on the topic of classical reception studies. Analysing the re-performance of classical plays in the United States, her lectures are described by Taplin as "somewhat of a milestone" in moving the subject closer to the mainstream of classical scholarship.

References

Bibliography

 

University of California, Berkeley
Classical Literature, Sather